Ljubomir Travica (born 1 October 1954) is a Serbian professional volleyball coach and former player. The current head coach of the Tunisian team, ES Tunis.

His son Dragan Travica is a volleyball player, former member of the Italy men's national volleyball team.

Biography
Travica was born in Ervenik and started his career with Mladost Zagreb. In 1980, he participated with Yugoslavia at the 1980 Summer Olympics held in Moscow.

He moved to Italy in 1983, and during his career, played for Panini Modena and Padova in Serie A1 (Italy's top division), and Vimercate and Brugherio in Serie A2. In 1991, he started his coaching career in Serie B1 in Valdagno, and subsequently coached different teams in the A1 and A2 divisions, before moving to Olympiacos Piraeus in Greece. From 2008 to 2011, Travica coached Asseco Resovia in Poland.

Honours

As a player
 CEV Challenge Cup
  1983/1984 – with Panini Modena

As a coach
 AVC Asian Club Championship
  Iran 2013 – with Al Rayyan

 CAVB African Club Championship
  Tunis 2021 – with ES Tunis

 National championships
 2002/2003  Greek Championship, with Olympiacos Piraeus
 2003/2004  Greek Championship, with Olympiacos Piraeus
 2008/2009  Polish Championship, with Asseco Resovia
 2012/2013  Emir Cup, with Al Rayyan
 2012/2013  Qatari Championship, with Al Rayyan
 2020/2021  Tunisian Cup, with ES Tunis
 2020/2021  Tunisian Championship, with ES Tunis

References

External links

 
 Coach profile at LegaVolley.it 
 Coach profile at Volleybox.net
 
 Player profile at LegaVolley.it 

1954 births
Living people
People from Ervenik
Serbs of Croatia
Yugoslav men's volleyball players
Serbia and Montenegro men's volleyball players
Serbian men's volleyball players
Olympic volleyball players of Yugoslavia
Volleyball players at the 1980 Summer Olympics
Serbian volleyball coaches
Serbian expatriate sportspeople in Italy
Expatriate volleyball players in Italy
Serbian expatriate sportspeople in Greece
Serbian expatriate sportspeople in Poland
Serbian expatriate sportspeople in Qatar
Serbian expatriate sportspeople in Iran
Serbian expatriate sportspeople in North Macedonia
Serbian expatriate sportspeople in Russia
Serbian expatriate sportspeople in Tunisia
Olympiacos S.C. coaches
Resovia (volleyball) coaches